Montalenghe is a comune (municipality) in the Metropolitan City of Turin in the Italian region Piedmont, located about 30 km northeast of Turin.

Main sights

Church of San Pietro, built in the 13th century but restored in the late 19th century.
Parish church of Beata Vergine delle Grazie (1760)
Castelvecchio (also known as Castellazzo), ruins of the old castle commanding the town (11th-12th centuries)
The so-called "Castle", in fact an 18th-century villa with a large park in the centre of the town. It houses a Lebanon cedar amongst the oldest in Italy.

References

Cities and towns in Piedmont
Canavese